ZGE-FM is a Tropical music station in George Town, Exuma, Bahamas.

External links 
  (Official Facebook page)

Radio stations in the Bahamas
Tropical music radio stations